Procol Harum Live: In Concert with the Edmonton Symphony Orchestra, by the English band Procol Harum together with the Edmonton Symphony Orchestra, was released in 1972; it was recorded at the Northern Alberta Jubilee Auditorium, in Edmonton, Alberta, Canada on 18 November 1971. The album reached No. 7 in Canada and was very successful on the Billboard Top 200, peaking at  It is the band's best-selling album, certified Gold by the RIAA. The live version of "Conquistador" from this album became a popular hit on both pop and progressive radio in the United States and reached the top 20 of the Billboard Hot 100, and the top 10 in several other countries.

Track listing
Lyrics for all songs by Keith Reid; music composed by Gary Brooker, except "In Held 'Twas in I" co-authored by Matthew Fisher.

 "Conquistador" - 5:02
 "Whaling Stories" - 7:41
 "A Salty Dog" - 5:34
 "All This and More" - 4:22
 "In Held 'Twas in I": - 19:00
a) "Glimpses of Nirvana"
b) "'Twas Teatime at the Circus"
c) "In the Autumn of My Madness"
d) "Look to Your Soul"
e) "Grand Finale"

A live version of "Luskus Delph" (Brooker, Reid) from the album Broken Barricades is also included on recent CD reissues (it had originally been the B-side of the "Conquistador" single, CHS 2003).  The 2009 Salvo reissue also includes rehearsal takes of "Simple Sister" and "Shine On Brightly" as additional bonus tracks.
Some LP copies of the album also have "Look to Your Soul" credited as "I Know If I'd Been Wiser".

Charts

Personnel
Procol Harum
 Chris Copping – organ
 Alan Cartwright – bass guitar
 B. J. Wilson – drums
 Dave Ball – guitar
 Gary Brooker – piano and vocals
 Keith Reid – lyrics
with:
 The Edmonton Symphony Orchestra
 Lawrence Leonard, conductor
 Da Camera Singers
Technical
Wally Heider, Ray Thompson, Tom Scott, Ken Caillat, Biff Dawes - recording engineers

References

External links
 ProcolHarum.com - ProcolHarum.com's page on this album
 
  Winspear Centre's history page on the Edmonton Symphony Orchestra

Procol Harum albums
Albums produced by Chris Thomas (record producer)
1972 live albums
Chrysalis Records live albums
A&M Records live albums
Collaborative albums